Joseph Patrick Nannetti  (1851 – 26 April 1915) was an Irish nationalist Home rule politician, trade union leader, and as Irish Parliamentary Party  member and Member of Parliament (MP) represented the constituency of College Green, Dublin in the House of Commons of the United Kingdom of Great Britain and Ireland 1900–1915.  He was a city councillor and Lord Mayor of Dublin.

Biography
Nannetti was born in Dublin in 1851 as son of an Italian sculptor and modeller. He was educated at the Baggot Street Convent School and the Christian Brother’s schools in Dublin. He married Mary, daughter of Edward Egan, in 1871.

First apprenticed to the printing trade and was afterwards employed in Liverpool, where he was one of the first founders of the Liverpool Home Rule organisation in Liverpool.  Returning home, he became secretary of the Dublin Trade Council, afterwards its President; he also led the Dublin Typographical Provident Society.

In the 1900 general election Nannetti was elected MP for the constituency of College Green, Dublin as a United Irish League supported Labour trade unionist, as well as in the 1906 election, the January 1910 and the December 1910 elections which seat he held until his death in 1915, having been paralysed by illness since 1913.

Nannetti had represented an older school of trade unionism, based on skilled workmen and emphasising shared interest between workmen and employer, which was challenged by the rise of Larkinism mass unionism. With the appearance of an independent Labour candidate in the subsequent by-election it was seen as significant in the drift of labour workers away from the Irish Party.

As a member of the Dublin Corporation Nannetti was elected Lord Mayor of Dublin  in 1906–07.  He was also a member of the Catholic Cemeteries Committee and Trustee of the Royal Liver Friendly Society.  He appears as a character in James Joyce's novel, Ulysses.

Nannetti died following a stroke on 26 April 1915.

References

External links
 

1851 births
1915 deaths
Irish trade unionists
UK MPs 1900–1906
UK MPs 1906–1910
UK MPs 1910–1918
Irish Parliamentary Party MPs
Members of the Parliament of the United Kingdom for County Dublin constituencies (1801–1922)
Lord Mayors of Dublin
Politicians from County Dublin
Irish people of Italian descent
Deaths from cerebrovascular disease